Henry Crowe may refer to:

 Henry Crowe (RAF officer) (1897–1983), World War I flying ace
 Henry Crowe (vicar) (1769–1851), English vicar and early animal rights writer
 Henry Pierson Crowe (1899–1991), U.S. Marine field grade officer
 Henry Woodfall Crowe (1832–1865), British-Norwegian interpreter, translator, and author